Puniceibacterium antarcticum is a Gram-negative, rod-shaped and aerobic bacterium from the genus of Puniceibacterium which has been isolated from seawater from the Antarctic.

References 

Rhodobacteraceae
Bacteria described in 2014